The SibNIA TVS-2DTS is a utility aircraft developed by the Siberian Aeronautics Research Institute under the program ljogki mnogozelevoi samoljot (Перспективный лёгкий многоцелевой самолёт) program for a light multi-role aircraft successor to the An-2 was developed. The abbreviation TVS stands for Turboprop Airplane (Turbovintowoy самолёт).

History 
The TVS-2DTS is a comprehensively modernized derivative of the twelve-seat An-2 biplane. The aircraft made its first flight on July 10, 2018, in Novosibirsk. It was planned to build five test aircraft to achieve certification in 2020.

In September 2019, it was announced that the SibNIA TVS-2DTS would not become the replacement of the An-2 aircraft type, rather the Ministry of Industry and Trade asked the government procurement portal for research and development for a design of a monoplane aircraft. The avoidance of non-Russian components and the engine played a significnt role.

In October 2019 UZGA (Ural Works of Civil Aviation) won the tender from the Russian Ministry of Industry and Trade for the development of a replacement for the AN2 with the alternative UZGA LMS-901 Baikal aircraft.

Construction 
Unlike the aluminium biplane An-2, the TVS-2DTS is constructed of compositess, has a turboprop engine and glass cockpit. It is based on the TVS-2MS, which has been in production since 2011. Unlike its predecessor, the fuselage and wings of the TVS-2DTS are made entirely of composite materials reinforced with carbon fibre. The lower wings have winglets that reach up to and are connected to the upper wings (closed wing). The STOL capabilities make the aircraft particularly suitable for military and civilian supply flights in areas with poor infrastructure. Other possible uses are firefighting or medical rescue flights.

Orders and deliveries 
In July 2017 there were 50 orders. The TVS-2DTS is to be built in the Novosibirsk region, initially at a production rate of 20 units per year.

Specifications

See also 
 Closed wing
 UZGA LMS-901 Baikal
 Antonov An-2
 Antonov An-3
 PZL M-15 Belphegor
 Cessna Caravan
 de Havilland Canada DHC-2 Beaver
 de Havilland Canada DHC-3 Otter
 de Havilland Dragon
 de Havilland Dove
 Pilatus PC-12
 List of aircraft types

External links

References 

2010s Russian civil utility aircraft